Ernakulam South metro station is a metro station of Kochi Metro. It was opened on 4 September 2019 as a part of the extension of the metro system from Maharaja's to Thaikoodam.

References

Kochi Metro stations
Railway stations in India opened in 2019